Gary Cameron (born 14 June 1966) is a former Australian rules footballer who played with Geelong in the Victorian (VFL) and Australian Football Leagues.

Cameron, a Katamatite recruit, who won the Tungamah Football League best and fairest award, the Lawless Medal in 1986, played eight games for Geelong in each of his first two seasons, 1987 and 1988. He appeared in the final five rounds of the 1989 VFL season, but didn't take part in the Geelong's finals series. After another five games in 1990, Cameron left to play for South Adelaide Football Club in the South Australian National Football League (SANFL).

Cameron was captain / coach of Wangaratta in the Ovens & Murray Football League in 1998 and 1999.

In 2007, Cameron briefly served as caretaker coach of South Adelaide, when coach Robert Pyman was sacked. Cameron was coach for four rounds.

References

1966 births
Australian rules footballers from Victoria (Australia)
Geelong Football Club players
South Adelaide Football Club players
South Adelaide Football Club coaches
Living people